Class 88 may refer to:
British Rail Class 88 (unbuilt), Originally a proposed electric variant of the Class 58
British Rail Class 88, Electro-diesel locomotive class
DRG Class 88, a class of German, 0-4-0T, goods train, tank locomotives operated by the Deutsche Reichsbahn comprising:
 Class 88.0: BBÖ 184
 Class 88.0: Mainz harbour railway Nos. 3 to 5
 Class 88.70: LBE T 1
 Class 88.71-72: Bavarian D IV
 Class 88.71II: BBÖ 189
 Class 88.72II: EWA IId
 Class 88.73: Palatine T 1
 Class 88.74: Württemberg T
 Class 88.75: Baden I b, Baden I e
 Class 88.76: Bremen harbour railway No. 4a
 Pacific National 88 class narrow gauge diesel locomotive.